Babble Cloud is a British internet telephony company headquartered in London with offices across the UK including North-West, Midlands, North East and the South Coast.

In August 2021, Babble acquired Concert (Concert Networks Limited) and 5 Rings (5 Rings Telecom Ltd and 5 Rings IT Ltd). In September 2021, Babble acquired Scottish telecoms firm 8020.

In October 2021, the company acquired Kilmarnock-based Halo Communications and Newcastle-based Digital Communications Systems Ltd (DCS.) In 2020 they acquired Stockport and Ellesmere Port-based IT and telecoms solution provider, Active.

References

External links
 

Telecommunications companies of the United Kingdom
British companies established in 2001